Domenico Mombelli (13 January 1755 – 15 March 1835) was an Italian operatic tenor and composer. Born in Villanova Monferrato, Mombelli was the head of a distinguished family of singers and musicians that included his first wife, Luisa Laschi who created the role of Countess Almaviva in The Marriage of Figaro; his second wife, Vincenza Viganò-Mombelli who wrote the libretto for Rossini's Demetrio e Polibio; and his daughters Ester and Anna, both of whom had successful careers as opera singers. He was also the founder and head of a travelling opera company which performed in Lisbon, Padua, and Milan from 1806 to 1811. Amongst his compositions were the opera Didone to a libretto by Metastasio, several oratorios, and three collections of arias for voice and piano. Mombelli spent his final years teaching singing in Bologna where he died at the age of 80.

References

1755 births
1835 deaths
Italian operatic tenors
People from the Province of Alessandria
19th-century classical composers
Italian classical composers
Italian opera composers
19th-century Italian male opera singers
19th-century Italian composers